The Castel C-24S was a training glider built in the late 1930s in France. It was a glider of high-wing monoplane configuration. In English, Castel C-24S translates to Castle C-24S. It was produced by the manufacturer Castel. Another product was built by the same manufacturer, under a similar name, which was called the Castel C-24. It was also built in the late 1930s. It can be assumed that the Castel C-24S is the successor to the Castel C-24.

Specifications

References

Glider aircraft